Polylepis incana is a species of plant in the family Rosaceae. It is found in Ecuador, Peru, and possibly Colombia. It is threatened by habitat loss.

References

incana
Flora of the Andes
Páramo flora
Vulnerable plants
Trees of Peru
Trees of Ecuador
Taxonomy articles created by Polbot